Denis Vladimirovich Pervushin (born 18 January 1977) is a Russian professional football coach and a former player. He is the manager of the Russia national under-16 football team.

Playing career
He made his professional debut in the Russian Third Division in 1994 for FC TRASKO Moscow. He played 3 games in the 1996–97 UEFA Cup for PFC CSKA Moscow.

Honours
 Belarusian Premier League champion: 2000.
 Russian Premier League bronze: 1999.

References

1977 births
Living people
Russian footballers
Russia youth international footballers
Russia under-21 international footballers
Association football defenders
Russian expatriate footballers
Expatriate footballers in Belarus
Russian Premier League players
PFC CSKA Moscow players
FC Metallurg Lipetsk players
FC Sokol Saratov players
FC Slavia Mozyr players
FC Amkar Perm players
Russian football managers
FC FShM Torpedo Moscow players
FC Sportakademklub Moscow players